Grossel, Grössel, Groessel  are German-language surnames. Notable people with the surnames include:

Matt Grossell, American politician
Ira Grossel, birth name of Jeff Chandler, American actor, film producer, and singer
Hanns Grössel,  German literary translator and broadcasting journalist

German-language surnames